Jerzy Limon (May 24, 1950 – March 3, 2021) was a Polish literary scholar, translator and writer specialising in Shakespearean and Elizabethan theatre. He initiated the creation of the Gdańsk Shakespeare Theatre and served as its first director.

Biography 
He was born in Malbork to a family deported from the Polish Eastern Borderlands. His father Zenon Limon was a gynaecologist and his mother Wanda a nurse. When he was 12, Limon sailed on the ocean liner MS Batory to the United States and spent over a year there with his uncle in Chapel Hill, North Carolina. It was there that he learned to speak English fluently.

He studied English philology and the History of Art at the University of Poznan, graduating in 1975. He wrote his master's thesis and then his doctoral dissertation under the supervision of Professor Henryk Zbierski, a historian of English literature and a Shakespearologist. Under his supervision, he explored the repertoire of London theatres in the years 1623–1624, and Cambridge University Press published his work in 1986 under the title Dangerous Matter. English Drama and Politics in 1623/24 as a fruit of his one-year scholarship at the British Council.

Limon taught at the Gdansk University and, as visitor, at New York's Hunter College, Washington's Shakespeare Institute and at the University of Delaware and the University of Colorado. His main topic of study became the activity of English actors in Central and Eastern Europe in the 17th century and the Elizabethan theatre in Gdańsk. In the 1990s, inspired by his research, Limon started working on organising the construction of the Gdańsk Shakespeare Theatre and reviving Shakespearean traditions in Gdańsk. To this end he created the Theatrum Gedanense Foundation, which organised the Gdańsk Shakespearean Days, and then the International Shakespeare Festival. Construction of the Gdańsk Shakespeare Theatre began on March 5, 2011, and the building was officially opened on September 19, 2014. Prince Charles and director Andrzej Wajda were patrons of the project, and Prince William and Kate, the Duchess of Cambridge, took a tour of the theatre with Limon in 2017. In 2014 Limon received the Order of the British Empire.

Jerzy Limon died on March 3, 2021, as a result of a COVID-19 infection. His funeral was held on March 27, 2021, World Theatre Day. He was buried at the Communal Cemetery in Sopot.

References 

1950 births
2021 deaths
People from Malbork
Adam Mickiewicz University in Poznań alumni
Deaths from the COVID-19 pandemic in Poland
Shakespearean scholars
Polish theatre directors
Officers of the Order of the British Empire